Playa Benítez is a beach of Ceuta, a Spanish city bordering northern Morocco. It forms part of the Punta Blanca. The beach is popular with sports enthusiasts.

References

Beaches of Ceuta